Marla Christine Tellez is an American news anchor for KTTV-TV in Los Angeles, California.

Early life and education
Tellez was born in San Francisco and raised in Sebastopol, California. She earned a Bachelor of Arts degree in political science from Sonoma State University in 1998.

Career
She studied political science at Sonoma State University.
Prior to being an anchor in Los Angeles, Tellez was an anchor for KNTV news, the local NBC news in San Jose, California. Prior to that, she was a producer and correspondent for CBS in San Francisco, and had also previously been an anchor at KOB in Albuquerque, New Mexico. During her tenure in New Mexico, she appeared in an episode of the hit show Breaking Bad as a news anchor.

Tellez joined the cast of Good Day L.A. in January 2014 as a news anchor. She was re-assigned to KTTV's early morning news program as co-anchor with Tony McEwing in late-May of that same year. Tellez has since anchored the 12:00 PM newscast for KTTV.

Personal life
On April 16, 2014, Tellez was involved in a car accident when a texting driver hit her car. She was not injured.

Filmography

Film

Television

References

External links
 Marla Tellez on myfoxla.com

Living people
American television actresses
American film actresses
American television journalists
People from San Francisco
People from the San Francisco Bay Area
Journalists from California
American women television journalists
21st-century American women
Year of birth missing (living people)